José Antonio Caro Díaz (born 3 May 1994), sometimes known as Churripi, is a Spanish professional footballer who plays as a goalkeeper for Burgos CF.

Club career

Sevilla
Born in La Palma del Condado, Province of Huelva, Andalusia, Caro played youth football with Sevilla FC. He made his senior debut with the C team on 23 September 2012, in a 1–0 Tercera División away win against CA Antoniano.

Caro first appeared for the reserves on 14 September 2014, playing the entire 1–0 home victory over CD El Palo in the Segunda División B. On 11 November he signed a new contract with the club, running until 2016.

On 26 April 2016, Caro further extended his link, signing until 2017. On 26 June, during the play-offs final against Lleida Esportiu, he converted the decisive penalty in the shootout as his side achieved promotion to Segunda División.

Caro made his professional debut on 2 September 2016, in a 1–1 home draw with UCAM Murcia CF. A regular starter during the season, he lost his position to Juan Soriano the following campaign as the latter ended in relegation.

Valladolid
On 28 July 2018, Caro signed a three-year contract with La Liga club Real Valladolid, and was immediately loaned to Albacete Balompié from the second division for one year. On 16 August of the following year, he moved to SD Ponferradina also in a temporary deal.

Caro shared the starting spot with Manu García during his spell at the Estadio El Toralín, being recalled by Valladolid on 12 January 2020. He made his debut in the Spanish top tier on 20 June, in a 1–0 loss at Atlético Madrid.

On 22 August 2020, Caro returned to Ponferradina on loan for the season. He received the first red card of his career on 30 May 2021, while he was on the bench of the 2–2 home draw with RCD Mallorca.

Burgos
Caro joined fellow second-tier Burgos CF in August 2021, also on loan. On 13 July of the following year, he agreed to a permanent two-year contract as a free agent.

Caro was named Player of the Month for September 2022, after conceding no goals in the first seven matches.

Honours
Individual
Segunda División Player of the Month: September 2022

References

External links

1994 births
Living people
Sportspeople from the Province of Huelva
Spanish footballers
Footballers from Andalusia
Association football goalkeepers
La Liga players
Segunda División players
Segunda División B players
Tercera División players
Sevilla FC C players
Sevilla Atlético players
Real Valladolid players
Albacete Balompié players
SD Ponferradina players
Burgos CF footballers